Jadwiga Staniszkis (born April 26, 1942 in Warsaw) is a Polish sociologist and political scientist, essayist, a former professor at the University of Warsaw and the Wyższa Szkoła Biznesu (Higher Business School), a Polish campus of National-Louis University.

Biography
Staniszkis is the granddaughter of the interwar politician Witold Teofil Staniszkis who was murdered in the Auschwitz concentration camp in 1941 during German occupation of Poland. Jadwiga Staniszkis studied sociology at the Warsaw University Faculty of Philosophy, obtaining a PhD in 1971 ("Patologie struktur organizacyjnych"). In 1978, she completed her habilitation in the humanities, in the department of sociology. Since 1991, she has been working as a university professor.

After her graduation, Staniszkis worked at the Department of Sociology at her alma mater. She actively contributed to political life at the university and was dismissed from the university and arrested for seven months for attending the protests of students and intellectuals against the communist government of the People's Republic of Poland during the 1968 Polish political crisis.

She is the author of several books on phenomena of socialism. Her first book about the dialectics of socialist society was translated into Japanese, but the Polish manuscript was confiscated by the secret service (SB) and lost. Her second book on the Solidarity movement has never been translated to Polish due to controversy, although it was published in French (two years before 'original' English edition). The fate of her book about the dynamics of transformation in Poland was similar, as it has not been published in Poland. Most of her works have been published after the transformation of the political system in Poland.

Awards
In 2004 Staniszkis was awarded the Prize of the Foundation for Polish Science, called the 'Polish Nobel Prize' in Poland. On 31 August 2006, President Lech Kaczynski awarded her the Commander's Cross of the Order of Polonia Restituta.

Works
Poland's Self-Limiting Revolution (1984)
“Forms of Reasoning as Ideology”. Telos 66 (Winter 1985-86). New York: Telos Press.
The Dynamics of the Breakthrough in Eastern Europe: The Polish Experience. Berkeley, California: University of Berkeley Press, 1991.
The Ontology of Socialism (1992)
Post-communism: Emerging Enigma (1999)
"The Epistemologies of Order: An Inquiry Into Genesis, Clashes and Collapse, ", in J. Koltan (ed.) Solidarity and the Crisis of Trust, Gdansk: European Solidarity Centre, 2016, pp. 95–120 (http://www.ecs.gda.pl/title,pid,1471.html).

References

External links 

Conflict over the Future of Eastern Europe: Russian, Hungarian and Polish Globalists, June 7, 1989 lecture available online via C-Span Video Library

Polish sociologists
Polish women sociologists
Academic staff of the University of Warsaw
Commanders of the Order of Polonia Restituta
Living people
1942 births
Writers from Warsaw
Polish women academics